Frölunda specialist hospital is located in Frölunda, right next to Frölunda torg, approximately nine kilometres south-west of central Gothenburg. The hospital primarily operate with elective care, with specialist in otolaryngology, neurology, gynaecology, orthopedic surgery, medicine, dermatology, ophthalmology, surgery, and radiography. The hospital was inaugurated in 1968 as a local hospital for people living in Tynnered, Frölunda, and Älvsborg. Today, 190 people work at the hospital which is owned by Västra Götaland Regional Council.

The hospital occupies the bottom five floors; the rest are residential.

Hospital buildings completed in 1968
Hospitals in Gothenburg
Hospitals established in 1968
1968 establishments in Sweden